Zoe Margaret Colletti (born November 27, 2001) is an American actress. She made her acting debut in the television pilot of American Men (2006) and played her first major-film role in Annie (2014). Colletti appeared in 2018 films Wildlife and Skin before garnering critical praise in the lead role of Stella Nicholls in horror film Scary Stories to Tell in the Dark (2019). She achieved further recognition and plaudits as Dakota in the sixth season of horror drama series Fear the Walking Dead (2020–2021) and the Truth Pixie in fantasy film A Boy Called Christmas (2021). In 2022 she portrayed Lucy in the second season of Only Murders in the Building.

Life and career
Zoe Margaret Colletti was born on November 27, 2001, in the United States. Her first credited role was in 2006's television pilot of American Men. In 2014, Colletti portrayed Tessie in Annie, her first major-film role. The film received negative reviews from critics, though the cast was praised. In 2018, Colletti starred in Wildlife and Skin, both of which garnered positive reviews. She played the lead role of Stella Nicholls in horror film Scary Stories to Tell in the Dark (2019), based on the children's books of the same name. According to TV Guide, Colletti sent an audition tape and was contacted within an hour. The film was praised, as was Coletti's performance. Variety called her "avidly captivating", and Empire said she "thankfully lends some emotive weight" to her character's issues and suffering. Colletti is set to reprise her role in the film's sequel.

In December 2019, Colletti reportedly joined the cast of the sixth season of AMC's Fear the Walking Dead as a series regular (later revealed to be Dakota). Colletti explained the role was "pretty crazy", having been a fan of The Walking Dead since age 12. She offered to be an extra in the original series; she unsuccessfully auditioned for The Walking Dead: World Beyond, though she was one of the final actresses running for the role. Despite a lack of success in World Beyond, the audition gave her connections with other shows in the franchise, and casting directors offered her the role in Fear the Walking Dead. Den of Geek commended her performance in "USS Pennsylvania", which aired on June 6, 2021, saying "Colletti is great[.] ... [She] brings a lot to the table this week ... [and has the] ability to bring real depth to Dakota". Dakota was killed off in the sixth-season finale, which aired a week later. In August of that year, she was cast as Gia, the best friend of Erika (Lana Condor), in Netflix comedy series Boo, Bitch. In November, she starred as the Truth Pixie (later revealed to be a younger version of Aunt Ruth (Maggie Smith)) in A Boy Called Christmas. The character was entirely—with the exception of its face, which was Colletti's—created using computer-generated imagery. The film was a critical success, and Colletti's performance received admiration. RogerEbert.com lauded her chemistry with co-star Henry Lawfull and "appealing sparkle".

Filmography

Film

Television

Notes

References

External links

Living people
2001 births
21st-century American actresses
American child actresses
American film actresses
American television actresses